Shenzhen Bay Port is a juxtaposed border crossing and a port of entry and exit between mainland China and the Hong Kong Special Administrative Region, located geographically in Dongjiaotou, Shekou, which lies on the southwestern corner of the city of Shenzhen in Guangdong Province.

The port of entry and exit consists of a cross-boundary passenger terminal building, where the counterparts of mainland China and the Hong Kong SAR are co-located. A "Shenzhen Bay Port Hong Kong Port Area", including part of the building and its adjacent area, and the entire length of the bridge on Chinese waters, is placed under Hong Kong jurisdiction under a lease until 30 June 2047, the eve of the 50th anniversary of the SAR. It is where Hong Kong's Shenzhen Bay Control Point is located.

The rest of the Port area is Shenzhen Bay Port Shenzhen Port Area.

The port of entry was commissioned on 1 July 2007.

History

Shenzhen Bay Port is part of the Hong Kong–Shenzhen Western Corridor, which was proposed by the Shenzhen municipal government to the Chinese central government  as well as the colonial British government of Hong Kong in the 1990s. Hong Kong became the first special administrative region of China (SAR) on 1 July 1997. In March 2001, a feasibility study by the Hong Kong government, suggested to build the Hong Kong–Shenzhen Western Corridor. A further inter-government meeting in July 2001 concluded that, the border checkpoint of the Corridor should be co-located in the same place, thus the birth of Shenzhen Bay Port, which was sub-divided into Hong Kong Port Area and Shenzhen Port Area. The name Shenzhen Bay Port was agreed by another inter-government meeting in August 2004. Hong Kong government also entrusted Shenzhen municipal government to build the facilities of the Shenzhen Bay Port Hong Kong Port Area in July 2004. Some of the facilities was also sub-contracted to Hong Kong firm, such as Hsin Chong–Aster JV was responsible for the electrical and mechanical engineering of the Passenger Terminal Building (Hong Kong Side) of the Hong Kong Port Area.

The Port was opened on 1 July 2007, the 10th anniversary of the SAR, when Hu Jintao, the then General Secretary of the Communist Party of China and Chinese President, attended the opening ceremony. Hu and 6 other people officiated the ribbon-cutting ceremony of the Port.

Road network

Hong Kong–Shenzhen Western Corridor

The Port connects to Hong Kong via the Shenzhen Bay Bridge, the main component of the Hong Kong–Shenzhen Western Corridor.

Management
Hong Kong government also managed the Shenzhen section of the Shenzhen Bay Bridge, another component of the Corridor, despite geographically inside the boundary of Shenzhen. Shenzhen section of the bridge was in-between the Hong Kong section of the bridge, and the land area of the Port, which partly leased to Hong Kong as Hong Kong Port Area.

Connection on the Hong Kong side
Once landed on the land area of Hong Kong at Ngau Hom Shek, the cross-border traffic would use Kong Sham Western Highway and then the existing road networks to go to their destinations in Hong Kong.

Connection on the Shenzhen side

Hong Kong Port Area

Shenzhen Bay Control Point, inside Hong Kong Port Area, is the first boundary control point with the immigration facilities of the Hong Kong side co-located in the same passenger terminal building with the mainland side. This allows passengers and vehicles for departure and arrival customs clearance to take place within a short distance. The Hong Kong Government has to pay rent to the Shenzhen government for the use of the port area, amounting to RMB 6 million per year. The rental agreement lasts until 30 June 2047.

See also
 Hong Kong West Kowloon railway station, another co-location of immigration and customs of Hong Kong and Mainland China
 Juxtaposed controls - co-location of immigration and customs on trains and ferries

External links

 Shenzhen Customs District
 Hong Kong Customs Passenger Clearance

Notes and references

Notes

References

 

2007 establishments in China
2007 establishments in Hong Kong
China–Hong Kong border crossings
Nanshan District, Shenzhen
Extra areas operated by NT taxis